Onitsuka Tiger (co-branded as Asics Tiger since 2022) is a Japanese sports fashion brand started in 1949 by Onitsuka Shōkai (鬼塚商会, Onitsuka Co., Ltd), a sports shoes company founded by Kihachiro Onitsuka. Onitsuka Shōkai changed its name several times before becoming Asics Corporation in 1977. Since 1977, Onitsuka Tiger has been sold as a lifestyle brand of Asics.

History

Early days 
Onitsuka Tiger's first product was a basketball shoe resembling a straw sandal. The shoe was a failure, and Onitsuka returned to the design stage to focus on the way basketball players started and stopped on the floor. By adding cups and small spaces in the soles of his basketball shoes, Onitsuka made a more effective shoe in 1952 which soon became popular throughout Japan. In 1955, the company increased its business to 500 sports shops across Japan.

Onitsuka Tiger worked with marathon runner Toru Terasawa in 1953 to develop a running shoe that would keep long distance runners from developing blisters. Ethiopian runner Abebe Bikila started wearing Onitsuka Tiger shoes in 1957, the first time in his running career he had ever worn shoes, convinced by Onitsuka that they would be superior to his barefoot style. The shoes were also worn in 1958 by short-distance runner Oliver Skilton when he won bronze in the Continental European games. In 1959, the sneakers brand launched the Magic Runner with improved technology on ventilation to prevent blisters and build comfort.

Early partnership with Nike 

In the late 1950s, University of Oregon middle-distance runner Philip Knight was coached by Bill Bowerman, one of the top coaches in the US. Bowerman was also known for experimenting with the design of running shoes to make them lighter and more shock-absorbent. After attending Oregon, Knight continued his studies at Stanford University, where he wrote his MBA thesis on the marketing of athletic shoes. After receiving his degree, Knight travelled to Japan where he contacted Onitsuka Tiger Co. Ltd, and convinced the company that their product had a market in the US. In 1963, Knight received his first shipment of Tiger shoes, and later he and Bowerman invested $500 each to form Blue Ribbon Sports (later known as Nike, Inc.).

Development of brands 

In 1964, Onitsuka listed the company on the Kobe Stock Exchange and later on the exchanges of Osaka and Tokyo. Onitsuka launched its "Olympic Line" after years of gathering suggestions from top athletes. This series marked the introduction of the Asics trademark design of two vertical lines intersecting a pair of lines emanating from the heel of the shoe, said to provide reinforcement as well as decoration. The first shoes to feature the Tiger Stripes were the Mexico 66 model, introduced two years before the 1968 Olympic Games in Mexico City.

In 1968, Blue Ribbon Sports started importing Onitsuka to the American market, including the TG-4 "Marathons", with nylon uppers and flat rubber soles, and their training shoe, the "Cortez", with an all-leather white upper and thickly padded soles. They also had an all-around exercise shoe called the "Bangkok" and racing spikes. Blue Ribbon Sports had their first store on the East Coast in Wellesley Hills, Massachusetts, which was very near the Boston Marathon route. Jeff Johnson was the manager, and he would attend many AAU meets, as well as high school cross country races, where he would be commonly seen selling his Onitsuka brand shoes from the trunk of his red Austin-Healey 3000 sports car.

In the 1970s, Onitsuka Tiger introduced the "Fabre", standing for the fast break move in basketball. The Japanese team wore the Fabre at the 1972 Summer Olympics in Munich, where they finished 14th. In 1972, sportswear companies GTO, Jelenk, and Onitsuka combined their financial and athletic positions to build a regional sales office near Hokkaido for the 1972 Winter Olympics.

In 1977, all sports brands of the company were merged into the brand Asics. In 1976, Finnish runner Lasse Virén won both the 5,000 and 10,000 meters at the 1976 Summer Olympics in Montreal while wearing Onitsuka Tigers, after having worn Adidas while winning those events in the 1972 Olympics. Today, the company is still known as Asics and provides shoes to retailers around the globe.

2000s relaunch 

The brand was then abandoned and relaunched in 2002, capitalizing on the new trend of vintage sneakers. In 2003, Uma Thurman wore gold-colored Onitsuka Taichi sneakers with black stripes with her yellow outfit in the movie Kill Bill. By 2007, the brand had opened 23 standalone stores. In 2008, Onitsuka Tiger launched a premium series, Nippon Made. In 2009, to celebrate its 60-year anniversary, Onitsuka Tiger launched its history book Made of Japan. In 2015, Onitsuka Tiger partnered with US-based design company Bait to create a Bruce Lee series.

In 2017, sales of the brand grew by 20% to 31.9 billion yen. In July 2017, Onitsuka Tiger launched what it publicized as the first augmented reality sneakers, but was merely an app animating the shoe's logo on a phone screen.

Description 

Since Onitsuka Tiger was incorporated in 1949, shoes have been created for football, running, martial arts, basketball, cheerleading, volleyball, cross-training, track and field, wrestling, golf, cricket, fencing, and tennis. The most famous brand of Onitsuka Tiger shoes is the striped Mexico 66 Line.

Asics still sells vintage style Onitsuka Tiger shoes, including the Mexico 66. The Asics acronym stands for "Anima Sana in Corpore Sano" or "A Healthy Soul in a Healthy Body", an adaptation of the ancient aphorism from Roman poet Juvenal, "Mens sana in corpore sano". In Asics' portfolio, the Asics brand is oriented towards sports performance, while the Onitsuka Tiger brand is imprinted in the casual sneaker fashion.

References

External links

 

Asics
Clothing companies established in 1949
Shoe companies of Japan
1949 establishments in Japan